The Meeker Southern Railroad  is a Class III shortline railroad owned by Ballard Terminal Railroad Company LLC that travels approximately  between East Puyallup ("Meeker") and McMillin, Washington, United States.

The Meeker Southern runs on former BNSF Railway tracks originally laid by the Northern Pacific Railway.

References

Switching and terminal railroads
Washington (state) railroads
Spin-offs of the BNSF Railway
Puyallup, Washington